Lubiń  is a village in the administrative district of Gmina Trzemeszno, within Gniezno County, Greater Poland Voivodeship, in west-central Poland.

The village has an approximate population of 280.

References

Villages in Gniezno County